C class may refer to:

Ships
 C-class destroyer (disambiguation), multiple destroyers
 C-class submarine (disambiguation), multiple submarines
 C-class corvette (disambiguation), ships of the Victorian Royal Navy
 C-class cruiser, Royal Navy light cruisers built just before the First World War
 C-class ferry, Canadian ships
 C-class lifeboat, British lifeboats
 International C-class catamaran, sailing catamaran

Rail vehicles

Australia
 C-class Melbourne tram
 Sydney C-Class Tram
 Commonwealth Railways C class, 4-6-0 passenger locomotives
 MRWA C class, 4-6-2 steam locomotives
 Victorian Railways C class, 2-8-0 steam locomotives
 Victorian Railways C class (diesel), diesel locomotives
 WAGR C class, axle load steam locomotives 
 WAGR C class (1880), steam locomotives 
 WAGR C class (diesel), diesel locomotives

Ireland
 CIE 201 Class, locomotives

New Zealand
 NZR C class (1873), tank locomotives
 NZR C class (1930), steam locomotives

United Kingdom
 LB&SCR C class, 0-6-0 freight steam locomotives
 LCDR C class, 2-4-0 steam locomotives 
 LNWR Class C, 0-8-0 steam locomotives
 NBR C Class, 0-6-0 steam locomotive
 Metropolitan Railway C Class, 0-4-4T tank locomotives
 SECR C class, 0-6-0 locomotives

Other uses
 C-class blimp, United States Navy blimp
 Mercedes-Benz C-Class, mid size passenger vehicle
 c-Class, a type of HP BladeSystem server computer
 C-segment, a European vehicle size class

See also
 Class C (disambiguation)
 C (disambiguation)
 Class (disambiguation)
 C series (disambiguation)